Le Bignon-du-Maine (literally Le Bignon of the Maine) is a commune in the Mayenne department in northwestern France.

Population

See also
Communes of Mayenne

References

Communes of Mayenne